BEAST 2 is a cross-platform program for Bayesian analysis of molecular sequences. It estimates rooted, timed phylogenies using a range of substitution and clock models, and a variety of tree priors. There is an associated tool, called BEAUTi, for setting up standard analyses (which are specified using XML). BEAST 2 is a complete re-write of the earlier (still actively developed) BEAST program and as such draws on a large body of work. A notable feature of BEAST 2 is the packaging system which has simplified the process of implementing novel models.

Taming the BEAST is a community driven resource which teaches the use of BEAST 2 and related phylogenetic software.

BEAUti 
BEAUti stands for "Bayesian Evolutionary Analysis Utility." It is a graphical user interface (GUI) that is used to create the input files for BEAST 2. It allows users to easily specify the various options and settings for their phylogenetic analysis, such as the data file, the model of molecular evolution, and the prior distributions of model parameters. BEAUti also allows users to specify the parameters for the MCMC analysis, such as the chain length and the sampling frequency. This makes it a user-friendly way to run BEAST 2, as it eliminates the need for users to manually edit XML input files.

BEAUti allows users to easily install and manage different packages, such as models of molecular evolution or coalescent models. These packages can be installed directly from within BEAUti, see for example the packages on the Comprehensive BEAST Archive Network (CBAN). This makes it easy to add new functionality to the analysis without needing to manually download and install the packages.

References

External links 
 

Phylogenetics software